Eudesmia arida, the arid eudesmia moth, is a moth of the family Erebidae. It was described by Skinner in 1906. It is found from Arizona to Texas and in Mexico.

Its wingspan is 23–30 mm. Adults have been recorded on wing from June to October.

The larvae feed on lichens.

References

Moths described in 1906
Eudesmia